Hiroshia albinigra is a moth in the family Drepanidae. It is found in Yunnan in China and in Vietnam, where it has been recorded from the Fansipan mountains.

References

Moths described in 2001
Thyatirinae
Moths of Asia